Barrett Comiskey (born September 18, 1975) is an American innovator. He is recognized by the World Economic Forum as a Technology Pioneer and was the youngest inductee into the National Inventors Hall of Fame, for inventing and co-founding E Ink while an undergraduate at the Massachusetts Institute of Technology. He is currently the Founder of Migo.

Career

E Ink 
Comiskey is one of the "fathers of E Ink." As an undergraduate at MIT, Comiskey invented the microencapsulated electrophoretic display, commercialized by E Ink, which he co-founded in 1997.

He began developing the E Ink display during nights and weekends at the MIT Media Lab in 1995, at the age of 19, after MIT professor Joseph Jacobson challenged him to create a technology that would mimic the appearance of ink on paper.

Comiskey ultimately conceived of the microencapsulated electrophoretic display, which overcame the many practical challenges faced by previous attempts at realizing workable particle-based displays. In 1997, after years of research and experimentation, Comiskey and fellow MIT undergraduate JD Albert realized a working prototype.

Over the next decade, Comiskey worked on the further development and industrialization of the technology at MIT and subsequently at E Ink, in both Cambridge, Massachusetts, and Shanghai, China.

For its role in the evolution of the publishing industry, E Ink has been called “the greatest innovation since Gutenberg.”

While still an undergraduate at MIT, Comiskey was published as first author of the May 1998 cover article of Nature magazine, "An electrophoretic ink for all-printed reflective electronic displays".

Comiskey holds 72 patents. He was recognized as a “Technology Pioneer” by the World Economic Forum, and was inducted into the National Inventors Hall of Fame in May 2016 for the invention and commercialization of E Ink, together with Joe Jacobson and JD Albert.

Nicobar Group 
After E Ink, Comiskey founded Nicobar Group, a niche business consultancy specializing in the China nuclear power market. 

In its early days, it was a startup "helping Western manufacturers and private equity firms do work in Asia", with a focus on developing strategy and executing technology and operations transfers in China. Today, it is more of a "one-stop shop" for foreign nuclear power players looking to enter the Chinese market.

Migo 
In 2009, Comiskey founded Migo, a technology company that "provides affordable data services for emerging markets." Its content delivery network distributes digital products and services to mass market consumers at the local corner store through Migo Download Stations (MDS). With a solution that is cheaper than alternatives, Migo aims to level the digital playing field for consumers with limited data usage.  

As of December 2021, Migo had 1,000 MDS in Indonesia. Migo aims to grow 10 times and cover up to 100 million people in Java, the world's most populous island, by end of 2022.  

Backed by sovereign wealth fund Temasek, YouTube's co-founder and former CTO Steve Chen, and other noteworthy investors, Migo's unique technology was shortlisted for the IBC 2021 Innovation Awards, for creating "an entirely new way to deliver digital content in countries that lack a widespread broadband infrastructure."

Personal life and education 
Comiskey holds an M.B.A. from Stanford University, a B.S. in Mathematics from MIT, and is an alumnus of Regis High School in New York City.

Profiled by Esquire magazine as "The New American," Comiskey grew up in New York City and has been in Asia since 2004, living in Shanghai, Taipei, and Manila.

References

American chief executives
American company founders
Massachusetts Institute of Technology School of Science alumni
Stanford Graduate School of Business alumni
1975 births
Place of birth missing (living people)
Living people
20th-century American inventors
21st-century American inventors